Coill Dubh (meaning "black wood") is a town in Ireland in northern County Kildare, at the junction of the R403 and R408 regional roads, about  from Dublin. It had a population of 684 as of the 2006 census, representing an increase of 15% over the 2002 census. By the time of the 2016 census, Coill Dubh had a population of 746 people.

The village is home to Coill Dubh GAA club, which has won the Kildare Senior Hurling Championship eleven times.

History
The town was established in 1952 on the townland of Blackwood ("Coill Dubh" is an Irish translation), just off the R403 between Prosperous, County Kildare and Timahoe, County Kildare to accommodate workers on the Bord na Mona works supplying a peat fired power station in Allenwood. It replaced earlier temporary workers camps at Killinthomas, Mucklon and Timahoe, with 160 houses and four shops.

See also
 List of towns and villages in Ireland

Bibliography
 Timahoe Historical Society: Historical Paths Revisited with contributions by Owen Denneny, Liam Egan, Patience Pollard, Ted Creavin, Liam Holton, Paddy Byrne, Andy Flaherty, Aileen Saunders and John Clohessy.

References

External links
 Coill Dubh library
 Coill Dubh Association Football

Towns and villages in County Kildare
Articles on towns and villages in Ireland possibly missing Irish place names